Bonnet is a French surname.

Geographical distribution
As of 2014, 83.0% of all known bearers of the surname Bonnet were residents of France (frequency 1:975), 3.4% of the United States (1:129,853), 2.0% of Haiti (1:6,444), 1.5% of Germany (1:63,573), 1.5% of Belgium (1:9,227), 1.2% of Argentina (1:41,660) and 1.0% of the Dominican Republic (1:12,540).

In France, the frequency of the surname was higher than national average (1:975) in the following regions:
 1. French Guiana (1:406)
 2. Occitanie (1:538)
 3. Auvergne-Rhône-Alpes (1:571)
 4. Nouvelle-Aquitaine (1:651)
 5. Pays de la Loire (1:796)
 6. Provence-Alpes-Côte d'Azur (1:811)
 7. Bourgogne-Franche-Comté (1:921)
 8. Centre-Val de Loire (1:940)

People
Charles Bonnet (1720–1793), Swiss naturalist
Françoise Bonnet (born 1957), French long-distance runner
Georges Bonnet (1889–1973), French politician
Graham Bonnet (born 1947), British singer
Henri Bonnet (1888-1978), French politician and diplomat
Joseph Bonnet (1884–1944), French organist and composer
Leslie Bonnet (1902–1985), British RAF officer, duck breeder and writer
Louis Bonnet (1815–1892), French doctor and politician
Marie-Jo Bonnet (born 1945), French writer and historian
Pierre Ossian Bonnet (1819–1892), French mathematician
René Bonnet (1904–1983), French driver and automobile constructor
Rob Bonnet (born 1952), British journalist
Stede Bonnet (1688–1718), Barbadian pirate
William Bonnet (born 1982), French professional road bicycle racer

Fictional characters
Stephen Bonnet, a villain in Diana Gabaldon's Outlander series

References

French-language surnames
Occupational surnames
Surnames from nicknames